Asue Ighodalo is a Nigerian lawyer. He is alongside Femi Olubanwo, a founding partner of the law firm of Banwo-and-Ighodalo a corporate and commercial law practice in Nigeria specializing in advising major corporations on Corporate Finance, Capital Markets, Energy & Natural Resources, Mergers & Acquisitions, Banking & Securitization and Project Finance. He is the chairman sterling Bank, Director, NSIA - Nigerian Sovereign Investment Authority, Chairman NESG - Nigerian Economic Summit Group.

Early years
Asue Ighodalo is a product of King's College, Lagos. He obtained B.Sc degree in Economics from the University of Ibadan in 1981, an LL.B from the London School of Economics and Political Science (1984) and a B.L from the Nigerian Law School, Lagos (1985).

Later career
Upon graduation from Nigerian Law School, Lagos, Ighodalo worked as an Associate in the law firm of Chris Ogunbanjo & Co between 1985 and 1991, and in 1991 he set up Banwo & Ighodalo in partnership with Femi Olubanwo. The firm today is consistently ranked as a leading Nigerian law firm in the areas of Capital Markets, Securities, Mergers & Acquisitions. Mr. Ighodalo's core areas of practice include Corporate Finance, Capital Markets, Energy; Natural Resources, Mergers; Acquisitions, Banking; Securitization and Project Finance.
Ighodalo in 2014, successfully advised Zenith Bank Plc in connection with a US$500 million eurobond issuance and Diamond Bank Plc in connection with a US$200 million eurobond issuance respectively.

Publications and works
Ighodalo has presented several papers on capital markets issues both within and outside Nigeria, and also authored many articles in leading law publications. He sometimes lectures on corporate governance, directors' duties and responsibilities, and entrepreneurship at the Institute of Directors, Lagos Business School and FATE Foundation entrepreneurial training sessions, respectively.

Boards, memberships and awards

Asue is the Chairman, Board of Directors, Sterling Bank Plc, Dangote Flour Mills Plc and The Nigerian Economic Summit Group (NESG). He also sits on the boards of other public and private companies, Non-Governmental Organizations (“NGOs”) and a statutory body including the Okomu Oil Palm Company Plc Nigeria Sovereign Investment Authority (NSIA) FATE Foundation (an NGO committed to the development of entrepreneurs in Nigeria)

Ighodalo became the Chairman of Sterling Bank in August 2014. He is a member of Nigerian Bar Association (NBA), and is a past chairman of The NBA  – Section on Business Law (NBA SBL) . He is also a member of Association of International Petroleum Negotiators (AIPN), USA, Nigerian Economic Summit Group, International Bar Association (IBA), Nigerian Maritime Law Association, Commercial Law & Taxation Committee of the Lagos Chamber Of Commerce & Industry, London School of Economics Lawyers' Group and Associate Member Chartered Institute of Taxation.

Family 
Asue is happily married to Ifeyinwa, and they are blessed with a daughter.

References

Living people
20th-century Nigerian lawyers
University of Ibadan alumni
King's College, Lagos alumni
21st-century Nigerian businesspeople
Alumni of London Business School
Corporate lawyers
Nigerian chairpersons of corporations
Nigerian Law School alumni
Year of birth missing (living people)
21st-century Nigerian lawyers